Patsy Yates  is an Australian registered nurse, university professor, and institutional leader who works at the Queensland University of Technology (Brisbane), where she is a Distinguished Professor and Executive Dean of the Faculty of Health, Research Director of the Centre for Palliative Care Research and Education, and Co-Director of the Centre for Healthcare Transformation. She is a specialist in the field of palliative, cancer and aged care.

Education 

Yates completed her primary and secondary schooling at Loreto College Coorparoo, graduating in 1978.  She became a registered nurse at Princess Alexandra Hospital (Brisbane, 1981), and qualified in midwifery at Mater Mothers Hospital (Brisbane, 1985). She also completed degrees as Bachelor of Arts (1986), Master of Social Science (1992) and PhD (2000) at the University of Queensland.  In her PhD and derived work, she explored the experiences of recently bereaved caregivers of people with cancer.

Career 

After years working as a clinical nurse, Yates began a career as a nurse educator at the Holy Spirit Hospital(Brisbane).  In 2003 and in 2010 she successively became Research Director, and Director of the Centre for Palliative Care Research and Education of Queensland Health, two appointments that she still holds. In 2005 she became Professor of the School of Nursing, Queensland University of Technology, where she successively became Deputy Head of School (2010-2013), Head of School (2014-2020), and Executive Dean of the Faculty of Health since 2020 to present.

She has been a tutor to many postgraduate students at QUT. Along her career she has been awarded substantial grants as a principal investigator to conduct research in the field of palliative care from institutions like the National Health and Medical Research Council ( Australia), the Australian Department of Health and the Oncology Nursing Society (US) and others.

As a journal editor, she has been editorial board member at Asia Pacific Journal of Oncology Nursing (2006 -), Cancer Nursing (2008 -), Progress in Palliative Care (2003 -), European Journal of Oncology Nursing (2009 -),  Collegian (2014 -), Revista Latino-Americana de Enfermagem (2013-2016), and Journal of Nursing Research (2016 -);  also Co-editor of the Australian Journal of Cancer Nursing (1999 - 2008).

Over many years to present times, Yates has been a member of several bodies at the National Health and Medical Research Council, among them the Research Committee, the Ideas Grants Peer Review Mentor Committee, the  Innovation Assessment Working Group, and others. Also a member of the Primary Care Collaborative Cancer Clinical Trials Group Scientific Committee (PC4),

In the public policy field, Yates has been an advocate for increasing nurse-to-patient ratios, increasing public coverage of palliative cancer care, and supporting indigenous nursing scholarship.

As a leader, she is a past-President of Palliative Care Australia, and is President of the International Society of Nurses in Cancer Care.

In the 2020 Queen's Birthday Honours List, she was named a Member (AM) in the General Division of the Order of Australia. She was elected a Fellow of the Australian Academy of Heath and Medical Sciences in October 2022.

Works

Papers 
Yates has published over three hundred articles in academic journals. Her most cited articles are:

 (cited 277 times,according to Google Scholar [
 (cited 253 times, according to Google Scholar [ 
 (cited 188 times,according to Google Scholar [

Book chapters 
Her most cited book chapters are:

Awards 

 2007 Life membership as a Fellow of the Cancer Nurses Society of Australia
 2009 Tom Reeve Oration Award from the Clinical Oncological Society of Australia
 2010 Australian Learning and Teaching Council – Award for Outstanding Contribution to Student Learning
 2014 - Sigma Theta Tau International Nurse Researcher Hall of Fame in 2017
 2014  Awarded Premier's Award for Excellence in Leadership
 2017 QuARRIES Award for Best Consumer Focused Project
 2018 - Distinguished Researcher award from the Oncology Nursing Society (US).
 2018 Outstanding Achievement in Nursing / Midwifery Award by the Association of Queensland Nursing and Midwifery
 2020 Member (AM) in the General Division of the Order of Australia.

References 

Living people
People from Brisbane
Australian nurses
Academics from Brisbane
Australian women academics
21st-century Australian women scientists
Members of the Order of Australia
Fellows of the Australian Academy of Health and Medical Sciences
Year of birth missing (living people)